Talyshstan (also Talish, Talishstan, Tolışıston) is a historically and nowadays term denoting "the country of Talysh". It is also sometimes used to avoid homonymy with the name of the ethnos itself, Talysh, according to the common model of forming the names of territories and countries with the suffix -stan. Divided into two parts: Northern Talyshstan in Azerbaijan and Southern Talyshstan in Iran.In the north, it adjoins the Mugan plain in Azerbaijan and stretches in a narrow strip along the southern coast of the Caspian Sea to the settlement of Kopulchal, located near the port of Anzali in Iran. Talyshstan is also sometimes referred to as the Talysh-Mugan Autonomous Republic, which was declared in 1993. The term Talyshstan was historically met by a number of medieval authors in relation to the region in Gilan. The medieval cartographer Mohammad Saleh Esfahani used the term "Talyshstan" already in 1609 in relation to Gilan. The toponym "Talyshstan" in the Lahijan County (Gilan,Biye-pis), inhabited by the Talysh, is used by Abd-Al-Fattah Fumeni in his work "The History of Gilan" .

According Muhammad Isfahani, Tálish,  the name of a son of Japhet , the son of Noah ( on whom be the peace of God ! ): from him the name was given to a tribe in Gilán, and from that tribe the country was called Tálishistán.

See also 
 Talysh-Mughan Autonomous Republic
 Ispahbads of Gilan
 Safavid Talish
 Daylam
 History of Talysh
 Talish-i Gushtasbi
 Talysh Khanate
 Mughan Soviet Republic
 Lankaran Uyezd
 Paytakaran
 Mughan (province)
 Cadusii
 Gelae (Scythian tribe)
 Origin of the Talysh people
 Caspiane
 Talysh assimilation

References 

History of Talysh
Talysh